Azmath Ali (born 26 January 1956) is an Indian former cricketer. He played two first-class matches for Hyderabad between 1979 and 1982.

See also
 List of Hyderabad cricketers

References

External links
 

1956 births
Living people
Indian cricketers
Hyderabad cricketers
Place of birth missing (living people)